This article lists the names of the 16 synods and 166 presbyteries in the Presbyterian Church (U.S.A.).

Synods

There are 16 synods in PC(USA). A synod is a regional governing body that is made up of presbyteries.

The following are the synods of the PC(USA):
 Synod of Alaska-Northwest
 Synod of Boriquen (Puerto Rico)
 Synod of the Covenant
 Synod of Lakes and Prairies
 Synod of Lincoln Trails
 Synod of Living Waters
 Synod of Mid-America
 Synod of the Mid-Atlantic
 Synod of the Northeast
 Synod of the Pacific
 Synod of the Rocky Mountains
 Synod of South Atlantic
 Synod of Southern California and Hawaii
 Synod of the Southwest
 Synod of the Sun
 Synod of the Trinity

Presbyteries
There are 166 presbyteries in PC(USA). A presbytery is a regional governing body or lower judicatories that is made up of local churches. In official communications, many of these presbyteries use "Presbytery of" in front of their names, for example, "Presbytery of The James."

Synod of Alaska-Northwest

 Inland Northwest
 Northwest Coast
 Olympia
 Seattle
 Yukon

Synod of Boriquen (Puerto Rico)
 Noroeste (Northwest)
 San Juan
 Suroeste (Southwest)

Synod of the Covenant
 Cincinnati
 Detroit
 Eastminster
 Lake Huron
 Lake Michigan
 Mackinac
 Maumee Valley
 Miami Valley
 Muskingum Valley
 Scioto Valley
 Western Reserve

Synod of Lakes and Prairies
 Central Nebraska
 Dakota
 Des Moines
 East Iowa
 Homestead
 John Knox
 Milwaukee
 Minnesota Valleys
 Missouri River Valley
 North Central Iowa
 Northern Plains
 Northern Waters
 Prospect Hill
 South Dakota
 Twin Cities Area
 Winnebago

Synod of Lincoln Trails
 Blackhawk
 Chicago
 Great Rivers
 Midwest Korean American
 Ohio Valley
 Southeastern Illinois
 Wabash Valley
 Whitewater Valley

Synod of Living Waters
 East Tennessee
 Holston
 Mid-Kentucky
 Mid-South
 Middle Tennessee
 Mississippi
 North Alabama
 St. Andrew
 Presbytery of Sheppards & Lapsley
 South Alabama
 Transylvania 
 Western Kentucky

Synod of Mid-America 
 Giddings-Lovejoy
 Heartland
 John Calvin
 Missouri Union
 Northern Kansas
 Southern Kansas

Synod of the Mid-Atlantic
 Abingdon
 Atlantic Korean
 Baltimore
 Charlotte
 Coastal Carolina
 Eastern Virginia
 The James   
 National Capital
 New Castle
 New Hope
 The Peaks
 Salem
 Shenandoah
 Western North Carolina

Synod of the Northeast
 Albany
 Boston
 Cayuga-Syracuse
 Central New Jersey
 Coastlands
 Eastern Korean
 Genesee Valley
 Geneva
 Highlands
 Hudson River
 Long Island
 New York City
 Northeast New Jersey
 Northern New England
 Northern New York
 Southern New England
 (The Presbytery For) Southern New Jersey
 Susquehanna Valley
 Utica
 Western New York

Synod of the Pacific
 Boise
 Cascades
 Eastern Oregon
 Kendall
 Nevada
 North Central California
 Redwoods
 San Francisco
 San Joaquin
 San Jose

Synod of the Rocky Mountains
 Denver
 Glacier
 Plains and Peaks
 Pueblo
 Utah
 Western Colorado
 Wyoming
 Yellowstone

Synod of South Atlantic
 Central Florida
 Charleston-Atlantic
 Cherokee
 Flint River
 Florida
 Foothills
 Greater Atlanta
 New Harmony
 Northeast Georgia
 Peace River
 Providence
 St. Augustine
 Savannah
 Tampa Bay
 Trinity
 Tropical Florida

Synod of Southern California and Hawaii
 Los Ranchos
 The Pacific
 Riverside
 San Diego
 San Fernando
 San Gabriel
 Santa Barbara

Synod of the Southwest
 de Cristo
 Grand Canyon
 Santa Fe
 Sierra Blanca

Synod of the Sun
 Arkansas
 Cimarron
 Eastern Oklahoma
 Grace
 Indian Nations
 Mission
 New Covenant
 Palo Duro
 Pines
 South Louisiana
 Tres Rios

Synod of the Trinity
 Beaver-Butler
 Carlisle
 Donegal
 Huntingdon
 Kiskiminetas
 Lackawanna
 Lake Erie
 Lehigh
 Northumberland
 Philadelphia
 Pittsburgh
 Redstone
 Shenango
 Upper Ohio Valley
 Washington
 West Virginia

References

Presbyterian Church (USA)
Presbyterian US
Presbyterian Church (USA)
Presbyterian